Events in the year 1997 in Japan. It corresponds to the year Heisei 9 (平成9年) in the Japanese calendar.

Incumbents
 Emperor: Akihito
 Prime Minister: Ryutaro Hashimoto (L–Okayama)
 Chief Cabinet Secretary: Seiroku Kajiyama (L–Ibaraki) until September 11, Kanezō Muraoka (L–Akita)
 Chief Justice of the Supreme Court: Toru Miyoshi until October 30, Shigeru Yamaguchi from October 31
 President of the House of Representatives: Sōichirō Itō (L–Miyagi)
 President of the House of Councillors: Jūrō Saitō (L–Mie)
 Diet sessions: 140th (regular, January 20 to June 18), 141st (extraordinary, September 29 to December 12)

Governors
Aichi Prefecture: Reiji Suzuki 
Akita Prefecture: Kikuji Sasaki (until 31 March); Sukeshiro Terata (starting 23 April)
Aomori Prefecture: Takeshi Numata 
Chiba Prefecture: Akiko Dōmoto 
Ehime Prefecture: Sadayuki Iga 
Fukui Prefecture: Yukio Kurita
Fukuoka Prefecture: Wataru Asō 
Fukushima Prefecture: Eisaku Satō
Gifu Prefecture: Taku Kajiwara 
Gunma Prefecture: Hiroyuki Kodera 
Hiroshima Prefecture: Yūzan Fujita 
Hokkaido: Tatsuya Hori
Hyogo Prefecture: Toshitami Kaihara 
Ibaraki Prefecture: Masaru Hashimoto 
Ishikawa Prefecture: Masanori Tanimoto
Iwate Prefecture: Hiroya Masuda 
Kagawa Prefecture: Jōichi Hirai 
Kagoshima Prefecture: Tatsurō Suga 
Kanagawa Prefecture: Hiroshi Okazaki 
Kochi Prefecture: Daijiro Hashimoto 
Kumamoto Prefecture: Joji Fukushima 
Kyoto Prefecture: Teiichi Aramaki 
Mie Prefecture: Masayasu Kitagawa 
Miyagi Prefecture: Shirō Asano 
Miyazaki Prefecture: Suketaka Matsukata 
Nagano Prefecture: Gorō Yoshimura 
Nagasaki Prefecture: Isamu Takada 
Nara Prefecture: Yoshiya Kakimoto
Niigata Prefecture: Ikuo Hirayama 
Oita Prefecture: Morihiko Hiramatsu 
Okayama Prefecture: Masahiro Ishii 
Okinawa Prefecture: Masahide Ōta
Osaka Prefecture: Knock Yokoyama 
Saga Prefecture: Isamu Imoto 
Saitama Prefecture: Yoshihiko Tsuchiya
Shiga Prefecture: Minoru Inaba 
Shiname Prefecture: Nobuyoshi Sumita 
Shizuoka Prefecture: Yoshinobu Ishikawa 
Tochigi Prefecture: Fumio Watanabe
Tokushima Prefecture: Toshio Endo 
Tokyo: Yukio Aoshima
Tottori Prefecture: Yuji Nishio 
Toyama Prefecture: Yutaka Nakaoki
Wakayama Prefecture: Isamu Nishiguchi 
Yamagata Prefecture: Kazuo Takahashi 
Yamaguchi Prefecture: Sekinari Nii 
Yamanashi Prefecture: Ken Amano

Events
 January 2 – Oil spill in Sea of Japan near the Oki Islands from the Russian crude oil tanker, Nakhodka. 
 February 1 – 1997 Aisin fire
 February 7 – MDM Corporation, as predecessor for Rakuten, founded in Tokyo.
 March 1 – Osaka Dome, a baseball stadium in Osaka, is completed.
 April 1 – The consumption tax rate is raised from 3 to 5%.
 May 8 – The Japanese Diet passes the Ainu Culture Law and repeals the Ainu Protection Act.
 May 30 – Nippon Kaigi is organized.
 July 10 – Debris blown by heavy rain in Harihara, Izumi, Kagoshima, kills 21, injures 13.
 July 12 – Hayao Miyazaki's anime film Princess Mononoke is released in cinemas.
 October 1 – Nagano Shinkansen open between Takasaki to Nagano, with Tokyo to Nagano direct high-speed rail train start.
 October 11 – The mixed martial arts organization PRIDE Fighting Championships holds its inaugural event at the Tokyo Dome in Tokyo, Japan. In the main event Rickson Gracie defeats Nobuhiko Takada by armbar.
 November – Financial institutions bankruptcy is linked, include Yamaichi Securities, Hokkaido Takushoku Bank, Sanyo securities and Tokuyo City Bank.
 December 11 – Framework Convention on Climate Change Conference of the Parties held in Kyoto. As a result of the meeting, the Kyoto Protocol to impose greenhouse gas emission reduction targets was adopted.
 December 16 – "Dennō Senshi Porygon", an episode of the Pokémon TV series, is aired in Japan, inducing seizures in hundreds of Japanese children.
 December 18 – Tokyo Bay Aqua-Line opens.
 The Toyota Prius, the first hybrid vehicle to go into full production, is unveiled in Japan on October 24, and goes on sale in Japan on December 9. It comes to U.S. showrooms on July 11, 2000.

Births

January 7 – Ayumi Ishida, singer
January 10 – Ayuri Konno, actress
January 22 – Erika Ikuta, actress
February 1 – Yūki Takahashi, professional baseball pitcher 
February 4 – Ayami Nakajō, actress and model
February 23 – Shiena Nishizawa, singer
March 4 – Daoko, singer
March 7 – Miki Honoka, actress
March 8 – Jurina Matsui, singer
March 24 – Mina, singer and member of K-pop girl group Twice
April 9 – Haruna Suzuki, figure skater
April 27 – Sayuki Takagi, singer 
May 7 – Irori Maeda, singer
June 4
 Riho, professional wrestler
 Kana Nakanishi, singer 
June 6 – Akane Yamaguchi, badminton player
June 14 – Fujii Kaze, singer-songwriter
July 7 – Erina Ikuta, singer
July 10 – Rena Katō, singer
August 10 – Sara Takatsuki, actress, model and singer 
September 3 – Hana Kimura, professional wrestler (d. 2020)
September 6 – Tsukushi, professional wrestler
October 14 – Miru Shiroma, singer and model
October 16 – Naomi Osaka, tennis player
November 14 – Ibuki Kido, actress
November 20 – Erii Yamazaki, voice actress 
November 23 – Akari Takeuchi, singer
December 17 – Shoma Uno, figure skater
December 20 – Suzuka Nakamoto, singer (Babymetal)

Deaths
February 17 – Ichimaru, Japanese recording artist and geisha (b. 1906)
March 10 – Yorozuya Kinnosuke, actor (b. 1932)
April 4 – Haruko Sugimura, actress (b. 1909)
May 9 – Kazumi Kawai, actress (b. 1964)
June 21 – Shintaro Katsu, actor (b. 1931)
July 23 – Chūhei Nambu, athlete (b. 1904)
August 1 – Norio Nagayama, spree killer and novelist (b. 1949)
August 28 – Masaru Takumi, Japanese yakuza lord (b. 1936)
September 30 – Nobuo Fujita, conducted only wartime aircraft-dropped bombing on continental United States of America (b. 1911)
October 4 – Gunpei Yokoi, creator of Game Boy and Game & Watch handheld systems (b. 1941)
November 18 – Un'ichi Hiratsuka, print-maker (b. 1895)
December 19 – Masaru Ibuka, electronics industrialist, co-founder of Sony (b. 1908)
December 20 – Juzo Itami, film director (b. 1933)
December 24 – Toshiro Mifune, actor (b. 1920)

See also
 1997 in Japanese television
 List of Japanese films of 1997

References

 1997 Year in Review – CNN

 
Years of the 20th century in Japan
Japan
Japan